Jennifer Alanyo is a Ugandan physician , military officer and Legislator. She represents the Uganda people's defence forces (UPDF) in the parliament of Uganda.

Background and Education 
Alanyo is a medical doctor by profession, she is also a UPDF military officer at the rank of Major.

She is among the high profile medical personnel in UPDF and heads the UPDF medical team, that among others supervises UPDF recruitment processes inoder to recruit healthy soldiers.

Career 
She was voted into parliament to represent the Uganda People's Defense Forces (UPDF) on recommendation from the military council and subsequent voting by military personnel.

She is among the 3 female representatives of UPDF in parliament, the others include, Charity Bainababo and Victor Nekesa.

In parliament, she serves on the committee on science, technology and innovation.

References 

Uganda People's Defence Force
Women members of the Parliament of Uganda
Members of the Parliament of Uganda
21st-century Ugandan politicians
Ugandan military personnel
Year of birth missing (living people)
Living people